Liv Marit Moland (15 January 1948 – 23 October 2008) was a Norwegian trade unionist and politician for the Labour Party.

She was born on the island of Hisøya as a daughter of chief administrative officer Leif Kaare Moland and Hjørdis Lied. She attended primary and secondary school in Hisøy and Arendal, and after finishing secondary education in 1967 she attended a domestic science school. She spent her working career as a cleaner, and was organized in a trade union; she was a national board member of the Norwegian Union of General Workers from 1975 to 1991.

She was a member of Hisøy school board from 1976 to 1980, then the municipal council from 1979 to 1991, serving as mayor from 1990 to 1991. She was then, as Hisøy municipality ceased to exist, a member of Arendal city council from 1991 to 1999, serving as deputy mayor from 1994 to 1995. She was elected to the Parliament of Norway from Aust-Agder in 1997, and served one term in the Standing Committee on Family, Cultural Affairs and Administration. She then served as a deputy representative during the term 2001–2005.

References

1948 births
2008 deaths
People from Arendal
Norwegian trade unionists
Members of the Storting
Labour Party (Norway) politicians
Mayors of places in Aust-Agder
Women members of the Storting
21st-century Norwegian politicians
21st-century Norwegian women politicians
20th-century Norwegian women politicians
20th-century Norwegian politicians
Women mayors of places in Norway